Jonnali Mikaela Parmenius (born 9 August 1987), better known by the stage name Noonie Bao, is a Swedish singer, songwriter and record producer. She has written songs for artists such as Don Diablo, Ava Max, Katy Perry, Zara Larsson, Charli XCX, Camila Cabello, Zedd, Avicii, Kygo, David Guetta, Clean Bandit, Alesso, Feed Me and Carly Rae Jepsen.

Early life
Parmenius was born in Stockholm, Sweden. She started singing at an early age, inspired by her musical parents, and performed in choir productions as a child. At the age of 12, she began to write her own songs, but at first, she did so in secret because she was embarrassed and uncomfortable singing about feelings. She attended a music school, where she was called a "black sheep". At the age of 15, a friend gave her the nickname Noonie Bao because of her appearance.

She briefly attended the Royal College of Music, Stockholm, but left and went to live with a friend in St. Gallen, Switzerland. She began to take a singing class and recorded her own songs in a friend's attic, which was her first contact with song production. Later, she worked in a recording studio in Paris.

Career
After two years abroad, Noonie Bao returned to her hometown of Stockholm, where she signed a contract with the label EMI as a songwriter. She also founded a music label called 2many Freckles. Under this label, she wrote and produced songs for Adiam Dymott, Clean Bandit, Frederic Sioen, and Tove Styrke. Bao produced several songs on Tove Styrke's 2010 self-titled album, which spent 35 weeks on the Swedish charts and peaked at number 10. In 2011, the Belgian band Das Pop became aware of a song by Noonie Bao and asked her to sing backing vocals on the song "Fair Weather Friends" from their album The Game. Bao later went on tour with the band in Belgium and Europe.

In January 2012, Bao released her debut single "About to Tell". In October, she released her debut album I Am Noonie Bao, which incorporates indie pop and folk musical styles. In late 2012, she went on tour in Sweden. In 2013, she was nominated for a Grammis award in the category of Best New Artist, but lost to Icona Pop. Bao later had success as a songwriter and featured singer for Avicii and Nicky Romero's song "I Could Be the One".

In 2014, Noonie Bao co-wrote the single "Doing It" from Charli XCX's album Sucker, which peaked at number eight on the UK singles chart, as well as contributing to three other tracks on the album. The two have continued to work together, including the majority of XCX's 2016 Vroom Vroom EP and three tracks from XCX's mixtape Number 1 Angel.

In 2015, Bao released the single "I'm in Love" on SoundCloud and YouTube. In November 2015, she released her first extended play Noonia, which made a transition into more pop-based production than had initially appeared on her debut album. Continuing with this sound, Bao released the Burns-produced single "Reminds Me" in April 2016.

Discography

Studio albums

Extended plays

Singles

As lead artist

As featured artist

Guest appearances

Songwriting credits
 indicates a background vocal contribution.

 indicates an un-credited lead vocal contribution.

 indicates a credited vocal/featured artist contribution.

Awards and nominations

References

External links

Swedish songwriters
Swedish pop singers
Singers from Stockholm
English-language singers from Sweden
Swedish women record producers
1987 births
Living people
21st-century Swedish singers
Musikförläggarnas pris winners